One, Two, Three and Away was a series of books for children written by Sheila K. McCullagh, often known as the Roger Red Hat Books, or The Village with Three Corners.  Illustrated mostly by Ferelith Eccles Williams and published by Collins in the 1960s–90s. Characters include Roger Red Hat, Billy Blue Hat, twins Johnny and Jennifer Yellow Hat, and Percy Green.

The books were written at a number of levels of increasing difficulty for those learning to read.  After the Pre-readers and Introductory book, there are 4 coloured sections, in increasing order of difficulty, blue, red, green, yellow.  Accompanying the red, green and yellow levels there are the Main Readers following a loose story arc, 1–3 in pink are aligned with red books, 4–5 with the green, and 6–10 with the yellow.

List of books 

Pre-readers

 (1) Red 
 (1a) Green
 (1b) Roger Red Hat and Mrs Green's hat
 (2) Blue 
 (2a) Red, Green, Blue, Yellow, and Brown
 (2b) Billy Blue Hat and the Snowman
 (3) Yellow
 (3a) Roger and the Ball
 (3b) Jennifer Yellow Hat and the White cat
 (4) Brown
 (4a) Roger and the Bus
 (4b) Jennifer Yellow Hat and Mr Brown's goat
 (5) One, Two, Three 
 (5a) I See Green
 (5b) four five six
 (6) Roger, Billy, Jennifer and Johnny  
 (6a) No, Percy Green!
 (6b) Seven Geese
 (7) Big and Little 
 (7a) The Yellow Cat and the Brown Dog
 (7b) The big man and the little mouse 
 (8) Houses
 (8a) Jennifer and the Yellow Cat
 (8b) Eight, Nine, Ten, Eleven, Twelve
 (9) The Little Yellow Cat and The Little Brown Mouse
 (9a) Stop it, Percy Green!
 (9b) Stop cried alex
 (10) The Cat, the Mouse, the Dog and the Frog
 (10a) Alex at the fair
 (10b) Roger at the fair
 (11) Billy went to school
 (11a) Billy's Picture
 (11b) Billy Blue-hat and the red mask
 (12) Jennifer went to school
 (12a) The donkey went to school
 (12b) Roger and the frog
 
Introductory books

 (A) Roger Red Hat 
 (B) Billy Blue-Hat 
 (C) Johnny and Jennifer Yellow-Hat
 (D) The Old Man 
 (E) Jennifer Yellow-Hat Went out in the Sunshine
 (F) Jennifer Went Out in the Dark 
 (G) Roger and Rip
 (H) Roger and the Pond
 (I) Roger and Mrs Blue-Hat 
 (J) Roger and the Little Mouse
 (K) Sita and Ramu
 (L) Jennifer Yellow-hat Went to Town
 (M) The donkey went to town
 (N) Percy Green
 (O) The Little Brown Mouse Went out in the Dark
 (P) Mrs Blue-Hat and the Little Brown Mouse
 (Q) Mr Blue Hat and the Red Cart
 (R) Roger, the stick and the old man
 (S) Mrs Rig and the Little Black Cat
 (T) Mrs Blue Hat and the Black Cat
 (U) Percy Green and Mr Red Hat's Car
 (V) Crash! The Car Hit a Tree
 (W) The Kite that blew away
 (X) Ramu and Sita and the Robber
 (Y) Jennifer and the little fox
 (Z) Miranda and the dragon

Main readers

 (1) The Village with three corners
 (1a) The Old Man and the Wind 
 (1b) Gopal and the little white cat 
 (2) Billy Blue-Hat and the Duck Pond
 (2a) The cat and the feather 
 (2b) Roger and the Ghost 
 (3) The Haystack 
 (3a) The Donkey
 (3b) The Empty House – Main Reader 
 (4)The Island in Deep River 
 (4a) The Two Giants
 (4b)The House in the Corner of the Wood
 (5) The Cat's Dance
 (6) The Stepping Stones
 (7) Billy Blue-Hat's Day
 (8) The White Owls
 (9) The Lost Dog
 (10) The Three Robbers 
 (11) A Boat on Deep River
 (12) The House in Dark Woods

Blue

 (1) The Dog and the Ball 
 (2) The Little Old Woman
 (3) The Big Dog and the Little White Cat
 (4) The Little Old Man and the Donkey
 (5) Rip's Bath
 (6) The Old Blue Bus
 (7) Sita and the Little Old Woman
 (8) Billy Blue Hat and the Frog
 (9) The Magic Wood (10) The Witch and the Donkey 
 (11) The Little Brown Mouse and the Apples 
 (12) Jennifer in Dark Woods 
 (13) Percy Green and Mrs Blue-hat 
 (14) Benjamin, the Witch, and the Donkey 
 (15) The Little Old Man and the Little Brown Mouse 
 (16) Jennifer and the Little Dog 
 (17) The old man and the seven mice 
 (18) Roger has a ride 
 (19) Miranda and the magic stones 
 (20) Miranda and the flying broomstick

Green

 (1) Roger and the School Bus 
 (2) The Little Old Man and the Little Black Cat 
 (3) The Little Old Woman and the Grandfather Clock 
 (4) Sita Climbs the Wall 
 (5) When the School Door Was Shut 
 (6) The Big Man, the Witch and the Donkey 
 (7) Caterpillars and Butterflies 
 (8) The Little Old Man and the Magic Stick 
 (9) Benjamin and the Little Fox 
 (10) The Cat and the Witch's Supper

Red

 (1) Jennifer and the Little Black Horse 
 (2) The Old Red Bus 
 (3) Billy and Percy Green 
 (4) Roger Rings the Bell 
 (5) Mr Brown's Goat 
 (6) Tom and the Monster 
 (7) The Ghost Train 
 (8) Sita and the Robin 
 (9) The Hole in the Wall 
 (10) The Little Fox

Yellow

 (1) Fire 
 (2) The House Across the Street 
 (3) Roger and the Cats 
 (4) Christmas in the Village with 3 Corners 
 (5) The Sleeping Giant 
 (6) Dancing Ann and the Green-Gruff-Grackle 
 (7) The Fire in the Magic Wood 
 (8) The King of the Magic Mountains 
 (9) The Witch Who Lived Next Door 
 (10) The Horse that Flew in the Moonlight

Critical response 

Educator Mary Walsh describes the scheme as one which was “strictly regulated, and with little interest in real stories or books”:  she describes the use of real stories to motivate children who were failing to learn to read on “One two three and away”.

Other media 

An educational video edition of One, Two, Three and Away: The Village with Three Corners was also released in 1996 by First Independent Video. Directed by Mark Taylor and produced by Bristol-based animation studio A Productions, the video consisted of drawn animation sequences, on screen games and songs. It was executive produced by Dan Maddicott at United Media.

Also available are teachers' notes and activity books, wooden dolls and stamp kits.

References

External links
 123andAway.com Limited Edition One, Two, Three and Away! Introductory A - P Books Published by The Reading Hut Ltd for the ICRWY I Can Read Without You) Project 

Children's fiction books
Children's short story collections
Series of children's books
William Collins, Sons books